Bruce D. Lohnes (born October 10, 1958) is a Canadian curler from Valley, Nova Scotia. Lohnes is a former Brier champion and World Championship bronze medallist. Lohnes is currently a high performance junior coach with the Nova Scotia Curling Association.  

Lohnes joined the Mark Dacey rink prior to the 2002-03 season, playing third on the team. Representing Nova Scotia, they would go on to win the 2004 Nokia Brier and a bronze at the 2004 Ford World Curling Championships for Canada. The team had been to three Briers together, returning in 2006, winning a bronze medal and 2009, finishing 10th. Lohnes had also been to three other Briers, but with different teams. He played third for Ragnar Kamp in 1989, third for David Jones in 1992 and as a skip in 1995.

Personal life
Lohnes is retired from the Nova Scotia Department of Natural Resources. He is married to Carolyn Stewart.

References

External links
 

1958 births
Brier champions
Curlers from Nova Scotia
Living people
People from Sydney, Nova Scotia
Sportspeople from the Cape Breton Regional Municipality
Canadian male curlers
Continental Cup of Curling participants
Canadian curling coaches
People from Windsor, Nova Scotia
Canada Cup (curling) participants
People from Hants County, Nova Scotia
People from Colchester County